Argentina competed at the 2004 Summer Paralympics in Athens, Greece. The team included fifty-five athletes, forty-four men and eleven women. Argentinian competitors won four medals, two silver and two bronze to finish sixty-second in the medal table.

Medallists

Sports

Athletics

Men's track

Men's field

Women's track

Women's field

Boccia

Cycling

Men's road

Men's track

Equestrian

Football 5-a-side
The men's football team won a silver medal after being defeated by Brazil in the gold medal match.

Players
Gonsalo Abbas Hachache
Diego Cerega
Eduardo Diaz
Carlos Ivan Figueroa
Dario Lencina
Antonio Mendoza
Oscar Moreno
Julio Ramirez
Lucas Rodriguez
Silvio Velo

Tournament

Football 7-a-side
The men's football 7-a-side team didn't win any medals: they were defeated by Russia in the bronze medal match.

Players
Claudio Bastias
Diego Canals
Carlos Cardinal
Claudio Conte
Ezequiel Jaime
Emiliano Lopez
Claudio Morinigo
Gustavo Nahuelquin
Matias Nunez
Damian Pereyra
Javier Sosa
Mario Sosa

Tournament

Judo

Men

Swimming

Men

Women

Table tennis

Men

Women

Wheelchair fencing

Wheelchair tennis

See also
Argentina at the Paralympics
Argentina at the 2004 Summer Olympics

References 

Nations at the 2004 Summer Paralympics
2004
Summer Paralympics